The Ilam University of Medical Sciences is a university in Ilam, Iran. It was established in 1986. IUMS is the official medical university of the Ilam province which is associated with the Iranian Ministry of Health and Medical Education.  IUMS provides healthcare and treatment services to the community. IUMS with seven vice-chancellors, five faculties, 11 hospitals, and 63 healthcare centers tries to accomplish its research, education, and healthcare missions. This university welcomes qualified students and researchers to educate and investigate a wide range of medical fields, including medicine, pharmacology, allied medical sciences, dentistry, health sciences, nursing, and midwifery. The education schedule is semester-based.

International Journals 
 Journal of Basic Research in Medical Sciences
 Journal of Ilam University of Medical Sciences
 Plant Biotechnology Persa

See also
 Higher education in Iran
 List of universities in Iran

External links
 Official website 

Ilam University of Medicine
Ilam University of Medicine
Ilam
Education in Ilam Province
Buildings and structures in Ilam Province
1995 establishments in Iran